Achillea pratensis is a herbaceous perennial flowering plant in the sunflower family, closely related to A. millefolium. It is found in  Austria, Bavaria and South Tyrol.

Description
Achillea pratensis has pinnate leaves with a low number of leaflets compared to other A. millefolium and related species (15 per side on average). The inflorescence is comparatively loose. The plant is tetraploid.

References

pratensis
Flora of Austria
Flora of Italy